The following is a list of Grammy Awards winners and nominees from Argentina:

References 

Argentina
 Grammy
Grammy
Grammy